Ziguinchor Airport  is an airport serving Ziguinchor, the capital of the Ziguinchor Region (also known as Basse Casamance) in Senegal.

Airlines and destinations

References

External links
 
 

Airports in Senegal
Ziguinchor